Musical Whispers is a 2014 Nigerian film about autism and how to care for those with it. It was directed by Bond Emeruwa and written by Amaechi Ossai. The film was produced by Ebele Okaro.

Premier 
The film was premiered 30 May 2014 sponsored by a pharmaceutical industry, in attendance are dignitaries and movie actors such as  Tonto Dikeh, Chioma Akpotha, Ebele Okaro-Onyiuke among others.

Cast 
Kalu Ikeagwu as David

Chioma Akpotha as Agatha Uche

Ebele Okaro as Jasmine

Other actors starring in musical whispers include Kalu Ikeagwu, Ekpeyoung Bassey, and Victor Okenwa, Belinda Effa, Chikezie Uwazie and Chinedu Mbadiwe.

Plot 
David and Agatha gave birth to an autistic son David jnr, Agatha is struggling to take care of the boy while David out of frustration engaged in extramarital affairs. Things got worst when Agatha lost her job but she didn't give up on her son yet as he is enrolled into music with the support of Jasmine, her friend and a musician, Jerry.

References 

2014 films
Nigerian drama films